This is a list of Belgian television related events from 1976.

Events
21 January - Pierre Rapsat is selected to represent Belgium at the 1976 Eurovision Song Contest with his song "Judy et Cie". He is selected to be the twenty-first Belgian Eurovision entry during Eurosong.

Debuts

Television shows

Ending this year

Births
29 October - Ann Van den Broeck, actress & singer
2 December - Roel Vanderstukken, actor & singer

Deaths